The greenback horse mackerel or greenback scad (Trachurus declivis) is a species of jack in the family Carangidae, found around western and southern Australia, and around New Zealand, from the surface to depths of 460 m.  Its length is up to 64 cm.

Its common name derives from the legend that other smaller species of fish could ride on its back over great distances. It is an important commercial fish and sports fishing quarry although it has strong tasting flesh.

Fisheries

References

Further reading
 
 Phallomedusa solida (Martens, 1878) Australian Faunal Directory. Retrieved 2 March 2012.
 Tony Ayling & Geoffrey Cox, Collins Guide to the Sea Fishes of New Zealand,  (William Collins Publishers Ltd, Auckland, New Zealand 1982) 

greenback horse mackerel
Marine fish of Southern Australia
Marine fish of New Zealand
Taxa named by Leonard Jenyns
greenback horse mackerel

da:Hestemakrel